The 1997 Torneo Clausura was part of the 46th completed season of the Primera B de Chile.

Everton was tournament’s champion after beating Rangers in the tie-breaker final.

League table

References

External links
 RSSSF 1997

Primera B de Chile seasons
Primera B
Chil